Albert Chase McArthur (February 2, 1881 – March 1951) was a Prairie School architect, and the designer of the Arizona Biltmore Hotel in Phoenix, Arizona.

Early years

Albert McArthur was born on February 2, 1881, in Dubuque, Iowa.  He was the eldest of the three sons of Warren McArthur Sr. and Minnie Jewel McArthur née Chase.  Warren McArthur Sr. was a business partner with Edward Everett Boynton in the Hamilton Lantern Company, and it was through McArthur that Boynton commissioned Frank Lloyd Wright to build the Edward E. Boynton House (1908) in Rochester, New York.

Warren McArthur Sr. was sometimes referred to as the "Pioneer Salesman of Tubular Lanterns." He was the executive sales manager of the C. T. Ham Company of Rochester NY, the R. E. Deitz Company of Chicago and other affiliated lamp-production companies.  In 1912 Warren McArthur Jr. designed what has been called the Short-Globe Tubular Lantern.

For Warren McArthur, Frank Lloyd Wright designed the McArthur House of 1892, 4852 South Kenwood Avenue in Chicago, Illinois.  It is one of Wright's so-called "bootleg" houses; a two-story house with Roman brick halfway up the first floor exterior, and a Louis Sullivanstyle arched main entrance. This was among the houses that led to Wright’s dismissal from Sullivan’s employ.

Albert McArthur was educated at the Armour Institute of Technology (later the Illinois Institute of Technology) in Chicago and  attended Harvard University in the class of 1905. Though he never graduated he was later asked to be the first president of the Harvard Club of Phoenix.

McArthur worked with architect Frank Lloyd Wright between 1907 and 1909.  This practice was a remarkable collection of creative architectural designers. As his son, John Lloyd Wright, says,
“William Drummond, Francis Barry Byrne, Walter Burley Griffin, Albert McArthur, Marion Mahony, Isabel Roberts and George Willis were the draftsmen. Five men, two women. They wore flowing ties, and smocks suitable to the realm. The men wore their hair like Papa, all except Albert, he didn’t have enough hair... I know that each one of them was then making valuable contributions to the pioneering of the modern American architecture for which my father gets the full glory, headaches and recognition today!” 

McArthur continued his education in Austria and Italy, opening an architectural firm in Chicago with partner Arthur S. Coffin in 1912. He moved his practice to Phoenix in 1925. The Biltmore is his most important design.  In the course of the Great Depression, all three of the McArthur brothers moved to Hollywood, California, in 1932. Albert Chase McArthur died in March 1951 in California.

The Arizona Biltmore

His brothers, Charles and Warren, Jr., commissioned Albert McArthur to design a resort hotel for them in Phoenix, which is the Arizona Biltmore.  Albert contacted Frank Lloyd Wright with an eye toward using Wright’s concrete textile block system for the hotel.  The system, perfected by Wright’s son Lloyd in California, was an ideal choice for material that could be produced on site, especially in the desert of Arizona. Wright was in desperate financial and legal shape at the time and sold the McArthur Brothers the right to use his patents for the textile block system although he did not own them, causing considerable embarrassment to the McArthur family when the actual holder of the patents sued the Biltmore Corporation for patent infringement. Albert had married the daughter of a wealthy Jewish chocolatier while studying in Vienna; true to his lifelong anti-semitism Wright always referred to Albert's son as Jew-boy. Wright often underplayed the contributions of those who were associated with him and never gave credit. Upon seeing the completed hotel he remarked that "it had turned out as badly as he expected" and then spent the rest of his life trying to claim authorship for this project.  Characteristic of this is the letter he wrote to Albert Chase McArthur’s widow, twenty-five years after the Arizona Biltmore’s completion: 
"I have always given Albert's name as architect ... and always will.  But I know better and so should you."
He made similar dismissive remarks at Albert's home immediately after Albert's funeral, and Charles McArthur struck him in the face, knocking him down.
The design of the brick used to build the Arizona Biltmore is not a stylized palm tree inspired by FLW as sometimes claimed but Albert Chase McArthur's chop (stylized signature stamp), based on the logarithm of a B-flat minor. When Taliesin restored the Talleys after the 1971/2 fire they recast the bricks from the original molds, but put them in sideways and upside down. Mrs. Talley, thinking that this could be a FLW project, banned Albert Chase McArthur from the property and removed the original thousands of pieces of Warren McArthur furniture which had been a major visual part and asset of the hotel.

There are other works by Albert Chase McArthur in the Phoenix area including a residence for M. D. B. Morgan, completed in 1927, and several houses in the Phoenix Country Club area.

References

1881 births
1951 deaths
20th-century American architects
Illinois Institute of Technology alumni
Harvard University alumni
Architects from Arizona